The article contains information about the 2022–23 Iran 3rd Division football season. This is the 4th rated football league in Iran after the Persian Gulf Cup, Azadegan League, and 2nd Division. The league has been started on 29 October 2022.

In total 85 teams (65 teams in the first stage in 5 groups, 20 teams in second stage) will compete in this season's competitions.

First stage
The top 2 teams from each group advance to the Second Stage. The teams ranked 3rd, 4th and 5th in each group (total 15 teams) are eligible to play in the First Round of next season. The teams ranked 6th and lower relegate to Provincial Leagues.

Qualified teams
Teams which are eligible to play in this round are as follows:

Relegated from 2nd Division (1 Team):

Relegated from 3rd Division – 2nd Stage (9 Teams):

Remaining from 3rd Division – 1st Stage (15 Teams):

Promoted from Provincial Leagues (34 Teams):

Free slots (6 teams):

Group A

Group B

Group C

Group D

Group E

Second stage

In this stage, 10 teams who qualified from 1st stage will join to 17 remaining teams from previous season and 3 relegated teams from 2nd division (total 30 teams). Teams will be divided into 3 groups of 10 teams each and play a round-robin home and away matches. The winner of each group will promote to 2nd division and 3 runners-up and the best 3rd placed team will qualify to Play-off stage. The 3 bottom clubs in each group and the worst 7th placed team among groups will relegate to next season's 1st stage.

Qualified teams
Relegated from 2nd Division (3 Teams):

Remaining Teams from last season (17 Teams):

Promoted from 1st Stage (10 Teams):

Group 1

Group 2

Group 3

Ranking of third-placed teams

Ranking of seventh-placed teams

Play-offs
Due to direct relegation of Omid Vahdat Khorasan from Azadegan League to 3rd Diviosn - 2nd stage (instead of 2nd Division), the team balance in leagues will not be as usual as previous seasons. According to similar situations in some seasons (such as 2018–19), it is possible that 5 teams from 3rd Diviosn - 2nd stage will promote to 2nd Diviosn (instead of 4). Therefore the playoff stage will consist of just one round and the two winners will qualify to 2nd Division as well.

Qualified teams
2nd placed teams in Second Stage (3 teams):
 TBD
 TBD
 TBD
Best 3rd placed team in Second Stage (1 team):
 TBD

First round

The winner  on aggregate will promote to second play-off round.

The winner  on aggregate will promote to second play-off round.

Second round

The winner on aggregate will promote to 2023-24 Iran Football's 2nd Division.

See also
 2022–23 Persian Gulf Pro League
 2022–23 Azadegan League
 2022–23 2nd Division
 2022–23 Hazfi Cup
 2022 Iranian Super Cup

References 

League 3 (Iran) seasons